İzmir Büyükşehir Belediyesi GSK is the women's handball team of the same named club sponsored by the Metropolitan Municipality of İzmir in Turkey. The team are currently competing in the Turkish Super League and the Women's EHF European Cup in the 2022–23 season. Their colors are blue and white.

Honours
Turkish Handball Super League:
Runner-up (1): 2010–11
Third place (2): 2007–08, 2021–22

Team

Current squad
Squad for the 2022–23 season.

Goalkeepers
 1  Anca Mihaela Rombescu
 29  Zeynep Onur
 35  Halime İslamoğlu
Wings
LW
 20  Ilayda Baktir
 22  Zeynep Öztürk
 53  Ecem Birben
RW
 4  Yasemin Özgür
 14  Gizem Koca
 77  Esra Sögüt
Pivots
 15  Merve Ceylan
 26  Sude Güngör
 47  Büsra Isikhan

Backs
LB
 19  Sibel Kiciroğlu
 21  Sude Naz Dag
 30  Anastasiia Savas
CB
 7  Yeliz Özel
 10  Burcu Dindar
 13  Tugba Diker
RB
 17  Ece Sözmen
 25  Gizem Buse Dalli

Notable former players

References

Handball women's
Turkish handball clubs
Women's handball in Turkey